Metarranthis warneri, or Warner's metarranthis, is a species of geometrid moth in the family Geometridae. It is found in North America.

The MONA or Hodges number for Metarranthis warneri is 6821.

Subspecies
These two subspecies belong to the species Metarranthis warneri:
 Metarranthis warneri cappsaria Rupert, 1943
 Metarranthis warneri warneri

References

Further reading

 

Ennominae
Articles created by Qbugbot
Moths described in 1874

Taxa named by Leon F. Harvey
Moths of North America